Michael Herbert (17 May 1925 – 20 June 2006) was an Irish Fianna Fáil politician.

Career
A publican from Castleconnell, County Limerick, he unsuccessfully contested the 1965 general election and was first elected to Dáil Éireann at the 1969 general election as a Fianna Fáil Teachta Dála (TD) for the Limerick East constituency. He was re-elected for the constituency until the 1981 general election when he did not stand for re-election.  He was again unsuccessful in the November 1982 election.

While a TD, Herbert served as a Member of the European Parliament from 1973 to 1979, being appointed to Ireland's first delegation, second delegation and third delegation.

In the first direct elections to the European Parliament in December 1979 he stood in the Munster constituency but was not elected.

He played hurling as a full-back with the Limerick Senior Hurling team, with whom he won a National Hurling League medal in 1947, and also with his local club Ahane. He retired prematurely from the game following a serious head injury caused by an assault with a hurley in a club match in 1949. His assailant received 12 months imprisonment. His brothers Seán Herbert and Tony Herbert were also hurlers with Limerick and his son Turlough Herbert was a member of the Limerick senior hurling panel for the 1994 All-Ireland final.

Michael Herbert died in 2006, aged 81.

See also
Families in the Oireachtas

References

External links
Michael Herbert file at Limerick City Library, Ireland

Fianna Fáil TDs
1925 births
2006 deaths
Irish sportsperson-politicians
Members of the 19th Dáil
Members of the 20th Dáil
Members of the 21st Dáil
Limerick inter-county hurlers
Ahane hurlers
Local councillors in County Limerick
Fianna Fáil MEPs
MEPs for the Republic of Ireland 1977–1979
MEPs for the Republic of Ireland 1973–1977
MEPs for the Republic of Ireland 1973